Hansruedi Süssli (born 22 August 1951) is a Swiss biathlete. He competed in the 20 km individual event at the 1976 Winter Olympics.

References

1951 births
Living people
Swiss male biathletes
Olympic biathletes of Switzerland
Biathletes at the 1976 Winter Olympics
Place of birth missing (living people)